We the Party is a 2012 comedy film written and directed by Mario Van Peebles and starring Mandela Van Peebles, Simone Battle, Moises Arias, Mario Van Peebles, and Snoop Dogg. Set in an ethnically diverse Los Angeles high school, it focuses on five friends as they deal with "romance, money, prom, college, sex, bullies, Facebook, fitting in, standing out, and finding themselves".

Cast
Mandela Van Peebles as Hendrix Sutton
Simone Battle as Cheyenne
Moises Arias as Quicktime
Makaylo Van Peebles as Obama
Ryan Vigil as Que
Patrick Cage II as Chowder
Y.G. as C.C.
Mario Van Peebles as Dr. Sutton
Salli Richardson-Whitfield as Principal Reynolds
Michael Jai White as Officer Davis
Tommy "Tiny" Lister as No Shame
Maya Van Peebles as Michelle
Quincy as Reggie
Carlito Olivero as Paco
Morgana Van Peebles as Megan
Dominic "Legacy" Thomas as Hill "H-One" Sutton
Benjamin "Ben J." Earl as Stunner
Snoop Dogg as Big D
The Rej3ctz as Themselves

See also
List of black films of the 2010s

References

External links
 
 

2012 films
American teen comedy films
Films directed by Mario Van Peebles
2010s teen comedy films
African-American comedy films
2012 comedy films
2010s English-language films
2010s American films